The 1934–35 season was Blackpool F.C.'s 34th season (31st consecutive) in the Football League. They competed in the 22-team Division Two, then the second tier of English football, finishing fourth.

Jimmy Hampson was the club's top scorer for the eighth consecutive season, with twenty goals.

Table

Notes

References

Blackpool F.C.
Blackpool F.C. seasons